Gos Trisang Yalag (? – ?) was an officer of Tibetan Empire. 

He was a "Shang" (imperial affine) of Tibet emperor, and Trisong Detsen was very trust him. He was a Buddhist. With his help, Trisong Detsen purged his regent Mashang Drompakye, and exiled Nganlam Takdra Lukhong to Changtang. Then, Buddhism was recognised as Tibet's state religion. Bon supporters were forced to convert to Buddhism, their cannons were buried into ground or throw into water.

Trisong Detsen hosted a famous two-year debate from 792-794 CE, which known as "Samye Debate" in mordern scholarship. The debate was between the Chinese and Indian Buddhist traditions as they were represented in Tibet. Trisang supported Kamalaśīla, an Indian Buddhist, against Chan Buddhist Moheyan. Finally, Kamalaśīla won the debate, and Moheyan was driven out of Tibet.

References
Old Tibetan Chronicle, P.T. 1287

8th-century Tibetan people
People of the Tibetan Empire